Jérôme-Étienne-Marie Richardot (29 June 1751 – 6 March 1794) was a French general of the French Revolutionary Wars. He rose to colonel of the 9th Regiment of Mounted Chasseurs on 26 January 1793, then to général de brigade on 7 April that year. However, he was arrested for inability later in 1793 by Philippe-François-Joseph Le Bas and died in prison in the Conciergerie in 1794.

See also
French generals

1751 births
1794 deaths
French generals
French military personnel of the French Revolutionary Wars